The state flag of Berlin, Germany has three stripes of red-white-red, the two outer stripes each occupying a fifth of its height, the middle the remaining three-fifths. It is emblazoned with a bear on the civil flag, while it bears the coat of arms of Berlin on the state flag.

The civil flag of West Berlin was adopted on 26 May 1954. Designed by Ottfried Neubecker, it came in second in the 1952 contest, the winner having been rejected by the Senate. The bear is placed slightly off-center toward the left.

A bear could be found on seals, coins, and signet rings from as early as the late 12th century (but not as a heraldic charge before 1709), presumably due to a canting association with the city's name.

The state flag replaces the bear with the full coat of arms, with the bear inside the escutcheon. Being the state flag for West Berlin, it became the flag of the entire city after the reunification of Germany in 1990. Prior to that, it had also been the naval ensign, as no other existing flag could be used. The proportions of the flag are 3:5. However, it was only used until 2007 when the  passed a bill to abolish the state flag. Since then, Berlin has had only one official flag.

Historical flags
Between 1618 and 1861 a bicolor of black over white was used as both a civil and state flag, under Brandenburg and successive Prussian rules.

Between 1861 and 1912, a horizontal triband ("tricolor") of black, red, and white was used in the proportions of  2:3. It was designed by Ernst Fidicin based on the colors of Brandenburg following the coronation of Wilhelm I on 19 December 1861.

Between 1913 and 1954, the civil flag was similar to the current one, except the design of the bear was different. Until 1935, the emblem itself was not established.

From 1955 on, East Berlin had the addition of two white stripes taking the outside halves of the upper and lower red stripes, and a slightly different design for the bear inside an escutcheon, topped with a crown. The East Berlin flag was therefore a slightly modified version of the old state flag, with the civil flag being deliberately avoided in East Berlin—and conversely, adopted as official in West Berlin—due to the bear in the civil flag being off-center to the left and facing left, strongly suggesting an orientation toward the West. The West Berlin flag was adopted for all of Berlin after 1990.

Flag days 
The senator for the Interior and Sports has designated several official flag days. On these days, the Berlin flag must be flown on all public buildings. They include:

On the Commemoration Day for the Victims of National Socialism and People's Mourning Day, flags must be flown at half-mast.

Flags of boroughs in Berlin 
All 12 boroughs have a flag.

See also

 Berolina, personification of Berlin
 Flags of German states

References

Berlin
Berlin
Berlin
Culture in Berlin
History of Berlin
Bears in art
Berlin